Dan Bordeianu (born 23 October 1975) is a Romanian actor and occasional singer, mostly known for his parts in telenovelas.

Career
His first part came when he was 11, in the movie "Promisiuni", starring Mircea Diaconu and Ion Caramitru.

In Romania, he became a familiar face after starring in the 2004–2005 soap-opera "Numai iubirea", produced by MediaPro Pictures, playing the troubled, yet good-hearted brother of main star Alexandru Papadopol. The show brought a high-profile romance with co-star Adela Popescu. MediaPro Pictures capitalised on their real-life relationship by producing two one-season soap-operas, Lacrimi de iubire and Iubire ca în filme, in 2005–2006 and 2006–2007, respectively, where the two also share their love on-screen. This fueled rumours that their relationship is actually a publicity stunt. As of 21 March 2007, they were no longer a couple.

He also had minor parts in the movies "Modigliani" and "Gunpowder, Treason & Plot", both filmed on location in Romania.

He also played the part of Vlad Dracula's teenage son in the movie Dark Prince: The True Story Of Dracula.

References

1975 births
Living people
Male actors from Bucharest
Romanian male film actors
Romanian male television actors
Romanian male soap opera actors
Romanian male child actors
21st-century Romanian male singers
21st-century Romanian singers